Chałupki (meaning "cottages") may refer to several localities in Poland:
Chałupki, Lower Silesian Voivodeship (south-west Poland)
Chałupki, Radomsko County in Łódź Voivodeship (central Poland)
Chałupki, Sieradz County in Łódź Voivodeship (central Poland)
Chałupki, Busko County in Świętokrzyskie Voivodeship (south-central Poland)
Chałupki, Kielce County in Świętokrzyskie Voivodeship (south-central Poland)
Chałupki, Nisko County in Subcarpathian Voivodeship (south-east Poland)
Chałupki, Przeworsk County in Subcarpathian Voivodeship (south-east Poland)
Chałupki, Racibórz County in Silesian Voivodeship (south Poland)
Chałupki, Włoszczowa County in Świętokrzyskie Voivodeship (south-central Poland)
Chałupki, Zawiercie County in Silesian Voivodeship (south Poland)

See also
 Chałupki Chotynieckie
 Chałupki Dębniańskie
 Chałupki Dusowskie